Juan Albano Pereira Márquez was a Portuguese merchant and the godfather and tutor of Bernardo O'Higgins. He is the ancestor of one of the most important Chilean colonial families.

Biography

Origin 

He was the son of Luis Pereira Vásquez and Josefa Márquez; they were both born in Porto, Portugal, and lived on La Palma Island in the archipelago of the Canary Islands.

By disposition of the Count of Superunda, he had Pereira established with factories in the Indies in 1753, he went to America, he was obtained permission from viceroy of Peru to trade; he was known for being a person of good treatment, honest and credit.

In Chile, he was settled in the city of San Agustín of Talca, where he was a prosperous merchant. However, on 8 April 1765, he was arrested and expelled from the Spanish Kingdom, in compliance with the order to expel all foreigners from Chile. With the help of the powerful universal secretary of the Dispatch of the Indies, Marquis de Sonora, he was allowed to return to Chile.

Pereira Márquez was married by proxy to María Mercedes de la Cruz y Bahamonde, daughter of Juan de la Cruz y Bernardotte and Silveria Álvarez de Bahamonde y Herrera; she died on 21 August 1768 without children. On 5 April he married his first wife's younger sister Bartolina de la Cruz. They had seven children: Juan, María del Rosario, María del Transito, Francisca de Borja, Casimiro, Nicolás, Carlos and Manuel.

He was brother-in-law of Juan Manuel, Anselmo, Nicolás and Vicente de la Cruz y Bahamonde.

Relationship with Ambrose and Bernardo O'Higgins 

Juan Albano Pereira Márquez was living in Talca when he had to close his shop in Santiago. This store was located next to that of Ambrose O'Higgins, Irish merchant, whom he would have a close friendship with for the rest of his life. O'Higgins entrusted him with the care of his son. The boy Bernardo arrived at this Albano Cruz family in November 1782 at 4 years old. This mission was entrusted to Domingo Tirarpegui, who without anyone noticing, his left Chillán with the child.

He arrived at Talca, handed it to Albano with a letter he from Ambrosio O'Higgins, in which he asked him to have his son, take care of him and give him a Christian education.

The priest Pedro Pablo de la Carrera and Dávila were consult to Juan Albano Pereira, about the doubts he deserved about whether or not child Bernardo would be baptized;  who grew up in his house. To save them and make clear his legal status and fulfill Ambrose O'Higgins assignment, which in the letter he recommended:

He was baptized in the parish church on 20 January 1783 and inscribed in the parish book as the son of Ambrose O'Higgins. His godparents were Juan Albano Pereira and his wife.

In April 1787 he stayed at Albano's house, Juan Martínez de Rozas, his old friend. Possessing the trust of the chairman Ambrose O'Higgins, and feeling already old Albano, he was  introduced by Dr. Rozas a boy who was raised in his house, so that there were witnesses about his identity and told him:

The following year, in April 1788, Pereira Márquez received Ambrose O'Higgins, who was traveling from Concepción to Santiago to assume his position as Governor of the Kingdom of Chile, this was the only encounter with his son Bernardo.

Talca corregidor, he was the chilote Juan Antonio de Salcedo y Carrillo, who made preparations for his reception:

The Governor's Carriage, followed by a retinue of neighbors, stopped before the Portuguese house. The entire Albano Cruz family was waiting for him at the door, among them the child Bernardo.

Ambrose O'Higgins was one of those men who, when dominated by great emotions, he is torn from them, showing great indifference or with a gesture that his puts them in evidence of their emotionality.

Both alone in the farm of Lircay, they have talked between Albano and O'Higgins, about their memories, mainly talking about their dialogues about little Bernardo. There Ambrose O'Higgins speak the state of his child education. The child Bernardo had learned to read, write and recite sentences. The father of O'Higgins to expressed to Albano his wishes that he be transferred to Chillán and returned to his mother's family to continue his education at his side.

The next day, Juan Albano Pereira asked his excellency that:

Ambrose O'Higgins strengthened the ties of friendship that united him to Juan Albano by knowing the heart of his esteemed wife, Bartolina de la Cruz and Bahamode, he was a friendship that continued for many years, even when  Ambrose O'Higgins went up to the solio de los Virreyes and Mrs. Bartolina spent her last years of widowhood in Talca.

A few days after leaving Talca the child Bernardo was sent to Chillán, not to return until 25 years later.

Chilean Independence Act 
On 12 February 1818 the Chilean Declaration of Independence was signed at Pereira's house, which today houses the Talca O'Higgins Museum.

Notable descendants

See also 
Conde del Maule 
Declaración de la Independencia
Elías Fernández Albano
Independence of Chile
 Talca Foundation

References

External links 
Real Academy of History about Juan Albano Pereira Marquez

1728 births
1790 deaths
18th-century Chilean people
18th-century Spanish people
18th-century Portuguese people
Spanish city founders
People of the Arauco War
Portuguese city founders